EEJ may refer to:
 Electroejaculation
 Equatorial electrojet